Suzanne Weyn (born July 7, 1955) is an American author. She primarily writes children's and young adult science fiction and fantasy novels and has written over fifty novels and short stories. She is best known for The Bar Code Tattoo, The Bar Code Rebellion and The Bar Code Prophecy. The Bar Code Tattoo has been translated into German, and in 2007 was nominated for the Jugendliteraturpreis for youth literature given by the German government. It was a 2007 Nevada Library nominee for Young Adult literature and American Library Association 2005 Quick Pick for Reluctant Young Adult Readers.

Biography 
Weyn spent her childhood in New York State and graduated from Nassau Community College and Binghamton University. Following college, Weyn worked as an editor of teen magazines, at Starlog Press, and at Scholastic Inc. before starting her writing career. She has been both an editor, project manager, and an author at Scholastic, Inc. Suzanne Weyn has taught expository, children's, and business writing at New York University. She continues to write and currently also teaches writing at City College of New York and Medgar Evers College. She has a Masters of Science in teaching adolescents from Pace University.

Books and novels 
Return to Cybertron
The Revenge of the Decepticons
Snow White and the Seven Dwarfs (based on the 1937 film)
The Day the Frogs Came to Lunch
Love Song
Little Women Diary
Into the Dream
All Alone in the Eighth Grade
Elliot's Ghost
My Brother, the Ghost
Jeepers Creepers (House of Horrors 3)
Catch That Kid (film novelization)
Mission without Permission
The Renaissance Kids
The Museum Chase
Sleepover (film novelization)
An Amazing Journey
The Night Dance: a Retelling of The Twelve Dancing PrincessesSimon Pulse
South Beach Sizzle, with Diana Gonzalez, Simon Pulse
Water Song: A Retelling of The Frog Prince Simon Pulse
Snowflake
Gracie (film novelization)
Mr. Magorium's Wonder Emporium (film novelization)
Reincarnation Scholastic Press
The Crimson Thread: A Retelling of Rumpelstiltskin Simon Pulse
Indiana Jones and the Temple of Doom (juvenile film novelization)
The Diamond Secret: A Retelling of Anastasia, Simon Pulse
Distant Waves: A Novel of the Titanic, Scholastic Press
Empty, Scholastic Press  
Invisible World Scholastic Press
Faces of the Dead Scholastic Press
Bionic Scholastic Press
Snapstreak Houghton Mifflin Harcourt
Novels in the Baby-Sitters Club series (ghostwritten), Scholastic

The Bar Code Tattoo Trilogy 
 The Bar Code Tattoo, 2004, Scholastic Point Thriller
 The Bar Code Rebellion, 2006, Scholastic Point Thriller
 The Bar Code Prophecy, 2012, Scholastic Press

The Haunted Museum Series
 The Titanic Locket, 2013, Scholastic Inc.
 The Phantom Music Box, 2014, Scholastic Inc.
 The Pearl Earring, 2015, Scholastic Inc.
 The Cursed Scarab, 2015, Scholastic Inc.

References

External links
Suzanne Weyn at Fantastic Fiction
Author website

1955 births
Living people
Writers from Queens, New York
20th-century American novelists
21st-century American novelists
American children's writers
American fantasy writers
American women novelists
American science fiction writers
American women short story writers
Binghamton University alumni
Women science fiction and fantasy writers
American women children's writers
20th-century American women writers
21st-century American women writers
People from Flushing, Queens
20th-century American short story writers
21st-century American short story writers
Nassau Community College alumni
Novelists from New York (state)
The Baby-Sitters Club